The women's artistic individual all-around gymnastics event at the 2017 Summer Universiade on August 22 at the Taipei Nangang Exhibition Center, Hall 1, 4F in Taipei, Taiwan.

Schedule
All times are Taiwan Standard Time (UTC+08:00)

Final results

References 

Women's artistic individual all-around